The Australian Basketball Association (ABA) National Finals was the finals series of the ABA contested between the best teams from the affiliated conferences. The National Finals were held every year between 1981 and 2008 except for 2001, when the event was cancelled due to the collapse of Ansett Airlines.

The ABA's roots can be traced back as far as 1965, and had a rich history until its demise in 2008. The ABA had a sole South/East conference from 1981 to 1985, then separate South and East conferences from 1986 to 1993. A South/East women's conference was introduced for the first time in 1990. In 1994, a North conference was included, which was followed by a Central conference in 1998, a Big V conference in 2000, and a Waratah conference in 2001. By 2001, the ABA consisted of six men's conferences and five women's conferences.

The ABA National Finals became known as the Australian Club Championships (ACC) in 2007 and continued on as such in 2008. The ABA was abandoned following the 2008 season, leaving its affiliated conferences to become independent leagues.

Men

South Eastern Conference roots

ABA National Champions

Results by teams

Women

ABA National Champions

Results by teams

See also

List of SEABL champions

Notes

References

External links
ABA National Champions 1981–1999
ABA National Champions 2002–2006
ABA National player awards

National Champions
ABA
Basketball in Australia lists